Pectis angustifolia, the lemonscented cinchweed, is a summer blooming annual plant which is found in Western North America, generally from Nebraska and Colorado to Arizona and Mexico. It is in flower from July to October, and the seeds ripen from September to October. Lemonscented cinchweed cannot grow in the shade. The plant is carminative and emetic. The crushed leaves have been used in the treatment of stomach aches.

Among the Hopi of Arizona it was known as taichima and was eaten boiled with green corn.

Bibliography

 p161. Yanovsky. E. Food Plants of the N. American Indians. Publication no. 237
 p177. Kunkel. G. Plants for Human Consumption
 p216. Whiting. A. F. Ethnobotany of the Hopi
 p235. Britton. N. L. Brown. A. An Illustrated Flora of the Northern United States and Canada
 p245. Genders. R. Scented Flora of the World.
 p257. Moerman. D. Native American Ethnobotany
 p274. Diggs, Jnr. G.M.; Lipscomb. B. L. & O'Kennon. R. J. Illustrated Flora of North Central Texas

References

angustifolia
Flora of the Western United States
Flora of Mexico
Medicinal plants of North America
Flora without expected TNC conservation status